Weyprecht Mountains is a small group of mountains about  west of the Payer Mountains, forming the western half of the Hoel Mountains in Queen Maud Land. 

They were discovered by the Third German Antarctic Expedition (1938–1939), led by Capt. Alfred Ritscher, and named for Karl Weyprecht, Austrian polar explorer who in company with Julius Payer discovered Franz Josef Land in 1873, and who initiated the first International Polar Year expedition in 1882–83.

See also
Rimebrekka Slope

Mountain ranges of Queen Maud Land
Princess Astrid Coast